In mathematics, the Bernstein–Zelevinsky classification, introduced by  and ,  classifies the irreducible complex smooth representations of a general linear group over a local field in terms of cuspidal representations.

References

 

Representation theory